Michel Flemmingsson Ekman (born 25 February 1956 in Helsinki) is a Swedish-speaking Finnish literary critic. He is a frequent contributor to Svenska Dagbladet and Hufvudstadsbladet. He has written several books. He won the Statsrådet Mauritz Hallbergs Prize in 2012. He lives and works in Helsinki.

References

1956 births
Living people
Finnish writers
Place of birth missing (living people)
Swedish-speaking Finns